Ernest S. McBride Sr. High School  is a high school in the Long Beach Unified School District. It was built in 2013.
The McBride mascot is the Wolves and its school colors are Blue and Silver.
The school is named after civil rights activist Ernest McBride, Sr.

References

External links

Education in Long Beach, California
High schools in Long Beach, California
High schools in Los Angeles County, California
2013 establishments in California
Educational institutions established in 2013